Alan Milner Everitt,  (17 August 1926 – 8 December 2008) was a British local historian. He was a leading figure in the development of English provincial history in the forty years after the Second World War.

Life and career 
Alan Milner Everitt was born on 17 August 1926, and grew up in the town of Sevenoaks. He earned his master's degree from the University of St Andrews in 1951 and a doctorate from the University of London in 1957, studying the prelude to the English Civil War under the supervision of R. C. Latham. That year, Everitt joined the University of Leicester as a research assistant to the economic and social historian Joan Thirsk. In 1968, he succeeded W. G. Hoskins as Hatton Professor of English Local History, a chair he held until retiring due to ill health in 1982. 

After his retirement, in 1989, he was elected a Fellow of the British Academy. 

He died on 8 December 2008, at the age of 82.

Books
Everitt was the author or editor of many books on English local history, including the ones listed below.

Authored
The County Committee of Kent in the Civil War (1957)
The Community of Kent and the Great Rebellion, 1640–1660 (1966)
Change in the Provinces: The Seventeenth Century (1969)
New Avenues in English Local History (1970)
The Pattern of Rural Dissent: The Nineteenth Century (1972)
Landscape and Community in England (1985)
Continuity and Colonization: The Evolution of Kentish Settlement (1986)

Edited
Suffolk and the Great Rebellion, 1640-1660 (1960)
Perspectives in English Urban History (1973)
English Local History at Leicester 1948–1978 (with Margery Tranter, 1981)

Notes

References
 Phythian-Adams, Charles (n.d.). "Professor Alan Everitt - Obituary". University of Leicester. Retrieved 18 April 2022.
 Thirsk, Joan (4 June 2019). "Alan Milner Everitt 1926–2008". Proceedings of the British Academy. Vol. 166, pages 180–197. Retrieved 18 April 2022.
 Thirsk, Joan (6 February 2009). "Alan Everitt". The Guardian. Retrieved 18 April 2022.
 "Alan Everitt: social historian of English provincial life". The Sunday Times. 2 February 2009. Retrieved 18 April 2022.

1926 births
2008 deaths
Place of birth missing
Place of death missing
Fellows of the British Academy
Alumni of the University of St Andrews
British local historians
Alumni of the University of London
People from Kent
20th-century British historians
Fellows of the Royal Historical Society
21st-century British historians